The 1999 Heineken Cup Final was the final match of the 1998–99 Heineken Cup, the fourth season of Europe's top club rugby union competition. The match was played on 30 January 1999 at Lansdowne Road in Dublin. The match was contested by Ulster of Ireland and Colomiers of France. Ulster won the match 21–6.

Colomiers opened the scoring through a Laurent Labit penalty, but Ulster fullback Simon Mason responded with four of his own before half-time. After the break, captain and fly-half David Humphreys added a drop goal, before Colomiers recorded another penalty from substitute Mickaël Carré, but Mason was able to kick two more for Ulster to put the match out of Colomiers' reach. Ulster centre Jonny Bell was named man of the match.

Match details

See also
1998–99 Heineken Cup

References

Final
1999
1999 in Northern Ireland sport
1998–99 in Irish rugby union
1998–99 in French rugby union
US Colomiers matches
Ulster Rugby matches